Poteria is a genus of tropical land snails with gills and an operculum, terrestrial gastropod mollusks in the family Neocyclotidae.

Species 
Species within the genus Poteria include:
 Poteria fasciatum
 Poteria translucida

References

Neocyclotidae